Deon Saffery, (born 28 January 1988) is a squash player who represented England as a junior and Wales as a senior. She reached a career-high world ranking of no. 42 in March 2015.

References

External links 
 

Welsh female squash players
Living people
1988 births